"Lovesick" (stylised as "Love$ick") is a single by Guernsey-born music producer Alex Crossan, under the alias Mura Masa, featuring vocals from ASAP Rocky. It was released on 30 September 2016, by Universal Music, Polydor and Anchor Point Records, as the second single for his self-titled debut album.

Recording and background
Crossan said about the recording of "Lovesick": "The first thing he [ASAP Rocky] said was that it made him feel really tropical, like he was in Ibiza or something and I was like, 'OK let's roll with that'. But then I said to him that it was about being stupid and feeling lovesick and hanging over a girl and he brought that to it as well. It was super fun, it was wild, we hung out, smoked cigarettes, talked about fashion and Tame Impala."

Composition
"Lovesick" is a vocal version of a previous instrumental track titled "Lovesick Fuck", which was released in his debut EP Someday Somewhere. Crossan said that "the track originally was about sex and how I was feeling after a particularly empty encounter with a friend told through a kind of twisted-pop, calypso, hip hop dance track".

Rachel Aroesti of The Guardian called the original instrumental "jazzy" and "tropical". Jon Pareles wrote for The New York Times that the song is "built on a Caribbean-tinged beat and a four-bar loop of a piano that soon switches its sound to steel drums". Collin Robinson of Stereogum opined that "Rocky injects the bouncy percussion and steel-drummed Caribbean vibes with some steez". Rap-Up described the song as "soulful and electronic, calypso-tinged, rap-infused". Eve Barlow of Pitchfork called it "airhorn-assisted calypso".

Critical reception
El Hunt of DIY said: "No revolutionary new angles come from this guest spot, but it's a statement of intent all the same".

Remixes and samples
The song has been remixed by Four Tet and Mumdance.

Track listing

Charts

Weekly charts

Year-end charts

Certifications

Release history

References

2016 songs
2016 singles
Mura Masa songs
ASAP Rocky songs
Calypso songs
Polydor Records singles
Universal Music Group singles
Songs written by ASAP Rocky
Songs written by Mura Masa